Bruce Alan Wagner (born March 22, 1954) is an American novelist and screenwriter based in Los Angeles known for his apocalyptic yet ultimately spiritual view of humanity as seen through the lens of the Hollywood entertainment industry.

Early life
Wagner was born in Madison, Wisconsin, to Morton Wagner and Bernice Maletz. When he was four, his family moved to San Francisco, then to Los Angeles four years later. His father was a radio station executive who eventually moved into television, producing The Les Crane Show, before becoming a stock broker. When his parents divorced, his mother worked at Saks Fifth Avenue, where she remained for 40 years. He attended Beverly Vista Elementary School in Beverly Hills, California, until the 8th grade. He attended Beverly Hills High School but dropped out in his junior year. He worked in bookstores, drove an ambulance for Schaefer Ambulance Service, and became a chauffeur at the Beverly Hills Hotel. He has two older sisters.

Career
In his twenties, Wagner began writing articles for magazines and writing scripts. His first screenplay, Young Lust, was produced by Robert Stigwood but was never released. It was that experience that ultimately led him to write his modern take on F. Scott Fitzgerald's "Pat Hobby" short stories about an alcoholic screenwriter who never gets ahead.

Wagner self-published (with Caldecott Chubb) Force Majeure: The Bud Wiggins Stories in an edition of 1,000, which sold out at West Hollywood's Book Soup. It was optioned by Oliver Stone to direct but the project never came to fruition. Wagner has said that the script he wrote, based upon the stories' protagonist - a chauffeur named Bud Wiggins - later became Maps to the Stars, the 2015 film directed by David Cronenberg. The book was well reviewed and led to a publishing deal with Random House.

He has written essays and op-ed pieces for publications including The New Yorker, The New York Times, Art Forum and Vanity Fair. His novel I'm Losing You was a New York Times Notable Book of the Year, and his novel The Chrysanthemum Palace was a PEN/Faulkner finalist in 2006. He has also written essays and prefaces for books by photographers William Eggleston and Manuel Alvarez Bravo, and painters Ed Ruscha and Richard Prince.

Wes Craven read an unproduced script of Wagner's ("They Sleep By Night"), which led Craven to ask Wagner to co-write A Nightmare on Elm Street 3: Dream Warriors (1987). Wagner and Craven wrote the story and share screenwriting credit with Chuck Russell and Frank Darabont. Wagner and Oliver Stone co-executive produced Wild Palms, the mini-series Wagner created, based on a comic strip that he wrote for Details magazine. Wild Palms aired on ABC in 1993. He was the executive producer and co-writer (with Tracey Ullman) of Tracey Ullman's State of the Union series (2008 - 2010) on Showtime. In 2014, David Cronenberg directed Wagner's script, Maps To The Stars, a film that Cronenberg had been trying to make for a decade. For her role as Havana Segrand, Julianne Moore won Best Actress at the Cannes Film Festival in 2014. Wagner accepted the award on her behalf. In 2020, he wrote Mother Tongue, an adaptation of his book I Met Someone. It will be directed by Mike Figgis on location in Hong Kong, in early 2021.

Wagner signed a book deal with Counterpoint Press in 2019 for his novel The Marvel Universe: Origin Stories. When he turned in the manuscript, Wagner said that the editor and publisher told him "the language is problematic." One of their objections was to the word "fat" - a 500-lb. character in the novel playfully calls herself "The Fat Joan" (an homage to the popular social media personality "The Fat Jew") - and stated that "not even a character can call herself that." The writer Sam Wasson  wrote about the book's journey in Graydon Carter's digital magazine AirMail ("Bruce Wagner's Woke Universe"), suspecting that Wagner's editor had been cautioned by "sensitivity readers." In the same article, Wasson quotes Wagner as saying, "My entire body of work would be thrown into a furnace if it were to be read and judged by sensitivity readers." On October 13, 2020, Wagner decided that rather than look for another publisher, he would release the novel for free, on brucewagner.la, and into the public domain. Within days, the book became available on-demand through Amazon, for which Wagner receives no profit. The book is also published in a limited, signed edition by Felix Farmer Press, a new publishing house in Los Angeles, for which Wagner also receives no profit by choice.

Personal life
Wagner married actress Rebecca De Mornay on December 16, 1986, and the couple divorced in 1990. He married Laura Peterson in 2009.

Mysticism
After interviewing Carlos Castaneda for Details magazine in 1994, Wagner became part of Castaneda's inner circle under the assumed name of Lorenzo Drake. He directed the first videos on Tensegrity for Cleargreen. Wagner continues to be close to the group since Castaneda's death in 1998. His first autobiographical piece about his experience with the shaman and author Castaneda appeared in the Fall 2007 issue of Tricycle magazine. After Wagner's novel Memorial was favorably reviewed in that magazine by a Buddhist monk, Wagner wrote its editor, James Shaheen, a letter of thanks, and Shaheen invited him to contribute an essay about Castaneda. Wagner and two partners own the television and film rights to all of Castaneda's books. More recently, Wagner studied with Indian guru Ramesh Balsekar.

Novels
 Force Majeure (1991)
 Wild Palms (1993) (graphic novel)
 I'm Losing You (1996)
 I'll Let You Go (2002)
 Still Holding (2003)
 The Chrysanthemum Palace (2005)
 Memorial (2006)
 Dead Stars (2012)
 The Empty Chair (2014)
 I Met Someone (2016)
 A Guide For Murdered Children (writing as Sarah Sparrow) (2018)
 The Marvel Universe: Origin Stories (2020)
 ROAR: American Master - The Oral Biography of Roger Orr (2022)

Screenplays
 Young Lust (1984)
 A Nightmare on Elm Street 3: Dream Warriors (1987), "story by" credit, shared with Wes Craven
 Scenes from the Class Struggle in Beverly Hills (1989)
 Wild Palms (1993)
 White Dwarf (1995)
 I'm Losing You (1998), also director
 Women in Film (2001), also director
 Maps to the Stars (2014)

Acting
Knight of Cups (2015) as Bud Wiggins
Maps to the Stars (2014) as Benjie's Chauffeur (uncredited)
Night Visions (1990) (TV Movie) as Agent
Shocker (1989) as Executioner
Scenes from the Class Struggle in Beverly Hills (1989) as Dinner Guest
How I Got Into College (1989) as A
I, Madman (1989) as Pianist
Mortuary Academy (1988) as Schuyler
Stranded (1987) as Reporter
The New Adventures of Beans Baxter (TV Series) as Vlodia (4 episodes)
One Crazy Summer (1986) as Uncle Frank
Head Office (1985) as Al Kennedy

References

External links
 
 Spike Magazine interview
 The Art of Reality in Tricycle

1954 births
20th-century American novelists
21st-century American novelists
American male novelists
Living people
Writers from Madison, Wisconsin
PEN/Faulkner Award for Fiction winners
Novelists from Wisconsin
Film directors from Wisconsin
20th-century American male writers
21st-century American male writers